The FLuorescence EXplorer (FLEX)  is a planned mission by the European Space Agency to launch a satellite to monitor the global steady-state chlorophyll fluorescence in terrestrial vegetation. FLEX was selected for funding on 19 November 2015 and will be launched on a Vega C rocket from Guiana Space Centre in mid-2025.

Overview
The FLuorescence EXplorer (FLEX) mission is the eighth mission in the Earth Explorer programme, (part of ESA's Living Planet Programme). It  comprises a satellite for the global monitoring of steady-state chlorophyll fluorescence in terrestrial vegetation. Leaf photosynthesis releases energy not required in the biochemical process in the form of light in wavelength between 640 and 800 nanometres.

After more than 70 years of basic and applied research in chlorophyll fluorescence, it is now established that fluorescence is a sensitive indicator of photosynthesis in both healthy and physiologically perturbed vegetation that can be used to monitor croplands and forests.

Fluorescence is a powerful non-invasive tool to track the status, resilience, and recovery of photochemical processes, and provides important information on overall photosynthetic performance with implications for related carbon sequestration.  The early responsiveness of fluorescence to atmospheric, soil and plant water balance, as well as to atmospheric chemistry and human intervention in land usage, makes it a useful biological indicator in improving the understanding of Earth system dynamics.

FLEX will encompass a three-instrument array for measurement of the interrelated features of fluorescence, hyperspectral reflectance, and canopy temperature. 

The program will involve a space and ground-measurement program of 3-years duration and will provide data formats for research and applied science.

See also

 Photosynthetic efficiency
 Phototroph

References

External links
FLEX - Report to ESA for mission selection
Workshops on the FLEX mission: 2007, 2010, 2014
FLEX Photosynthesis Study
FLEX Bridge Study
FLEX (Fluorescence Explorer) article on eoPortal

Fluorescence
Ecological metrics
Earth observation satellites of the European Space Agency
2025 in spaceflight
Proposed satellites
Spectrometers